Transformers: Cybertron, known as  in Japan, is an anime series which debuted on January 8, 2005. It is set in the Transformers universe. Produced by Aichi Television Broadcasting, We've, Tokyu Agency and Gonzo, the series is directed by Hiroyuki Kakudō and Manabu Ono, with Hiro Masaki handling series composition, Takashi Kumazen designing the characters, Mitsuru Ōwa serving as the mechanical and prop designer and Megumi Ōhashi composing the music. A corresponding toy line was released with the series.

The series was conceived by Hasbro as the final installment of a trilogy formed with the previous two series, Transformers: Armada and Transformers: Energon. However, the Japanese production did not follow through on this intent, scripting the series as an independent story unconnected to the preceding shows. The English dub partially modified the series to establish links back to Armada and Energon, including changes to dialogue and small portions of new animation. Trevor Devall voiced Megatron in early episodes the English dub before previous voice actor David Kaye returned, reprising the role from the show's predecessors.

In the anime, all of the Transformers are computer-generated, while the humans and backgrounds are rendered in traditional cel animation. Telecom Animation Film Company helped with the backgrounds. It was the last series in the Transformers franchise to be produced in Japan until the release of Transformers Go! in 2013.

Plot

When the destruction of Unicron results in the formation of a massive black hole, the planet Cybertron, home world of the Transformers, is threatened, and its population is evacuated to Earth, taking the forms of local vehicles and machinery to hide from humanity. As this occurs, Optimus Prime's elite team of Autobot warriors are approached by the ancient Transformer Vector Prime, who has emerged from his resting place in the void outside of time to inform them of the legendary Cyber Planet Keys, ancient artifacts of power which can stop the black hole and save the universe. Lost due to an accident during an attempt to create a cross-universal space bridge network, the Cyber Planet Keys now reside on four worlds somewhere in the universe – unfortunately, Vector Prime's map showing their location is stolen by Decepticon leader Megatron, and both forces relocate to Earth as the race to find them begins.

On Earth, the Autobots befriend three human children named Coby, Bud and Lori who aid them in locating the Omega Lock, the focusing device for the Cyber Planet Key's power. With new "Cyber Key Powers" awakened in them, the Transformers battle on many fronts, searching for the Lock on Earth while Hot Shot and Red Alert head for Velocitron, the Speed Planet which is the resting place of the first key and most of its inhabitants have racing vehicles modes. It is here that Megatron recruits known troublemakers Ransack and Crumplezone into the Decepticons. As Hot Shot competes in the planet's grand racing championship to win the key from planet leader Override, the Lock is located on Earth in the bulk of the crashed Transformer spaceship the Atlantis. Autobot Overhaul heads for Animatros the Jungle Planet which is the home of the Transformers who have beast modes. The power of Animatros' Cyber Planet Key reformats him into Leobreaker. Megatron ingratiates himself with Jungle Planet's dictator Scourge while his scheming lieutenant Starscream teams up with the mysterious Sideways, working towards his own goals.

Ultimately, the Autobots succeed in acquiring the Keys of both Velocitron and Jungle Planet, at which point the existence of Earth's own Cyber Planet Key is revealed. Starscream makes his power play and overthrows Megatron, stealing the Omega Lock and all three keys from the Autobots and using them to grow in size and power. Their forces bolstered by the ancient Autobots from Earth and the arrival of Wing Saber, who combines with Optimus Prime, the Autobots fight their way through a vengeful Megatron and defeat Starscream – but the battle is not without casualties, as Hot Shot, Red Alert and Scattershot are gravely wounded and rebuilt into the even more powerful "Cybertron Defense Team".

Upon returning to Cybertron, the Autobots use the Omega Lock and Cyber Planet Keys, which awakens the spirit of Primus, the deity who is creator of the Transformers, and Cybertron itself actually transforms into the god's body. After a battle in which Starscream taps the power of Primus and grows to planetary size – only to be defeated by Primus himself – the location of the fourth and final key is determined as Gigantion the Giant Planet which is the homeworld of the Minicons and the Transformers who are larger than normal while having construction vehicle modes. Gigantion, however, exists in another dimension, having fallen through a rift in space/time, And except for the kids and the Minicons, the others can't enter without having their minds separated from their bodies. Luckily, Red Alert has created a vaccine program (based on Technology from Vector prime's sword) to help but it is revealed that Jetfire has Trypanophobia and while the Autobots are able to reach the planet, the Decepticons are led there by the enigmatic Soundwave. Bested by the planet's leader Metroplex, Megatron taps the key's power to become Galvatron, and Sideways and Soundwave reveal themselves to be inhabitants of Planet X, a world destroyed by the Gigantions, upon whom they seek revenge. Galvatron blasts them and Starscream into another dimension and acquires the Lock and Keys for himself, intending to use their power to accelerate the universal degeneration caused by the black hole and remake the cosmos in his own image. Vector Prime sacrifices his life to allow the Autobots to return to their home universe, and the five planet leaders confront Galvatron within the black hole and defeat him. With all the Cyber Planet Keys now in his possession, Primus uses their power to finally seal the black hole, ending its threat.

As the planet's various civilizations attempt to return to life as normal, Galvatron attacks the Autobots for one final time. Without any troops to call his own, Galvatron engages Optimus Prime in a one-on-one duel, and is finally destroyed for good. As Galvatron is dying, he places his fist on Optimus' chest and says his final words. In the Japanese dub, he says "Galaxy Convoy..." which is Optimus' name in the Japanese version of the show. His last words in the American dub, however, are "I still function. You haven't won. Not while my spark still burns..." As he starts chuckling evilly, Optimus says "You fought well. Goodbye, Galvatron." As Galvatron disintegrates to space dust, Optimus kneels in front of Vector Prime's sword that Optimus used to slay Galvatron, still injured. As Jetfire and the others run over to Optimus to check on him, Optimus says "Don't worry. You won't get rid of me that easily." Galvatron is later seen in the credits of the last episode engaging Vector Prime in battle. With this final victory, Optimus Prime begins a new space bridge initiative, and the Transformers set sail for the four corners of the universe, and new adventures.

Cyber Planet Keys
Cyber Planet Keys (Planet Force in Galaxy Force) are four mystical items that form the crux of Transformers: Cybertron's plot; in order to stop the black hole that is threatening the universe, the Autobots must gather all four. Also seeking to attain them are the Decepticons, who want to use their power for their own ends.

The Cyber Planet Keys are formed from the spark of Primus and were used eons ago in the Space Bridge project that was meant to link all populated planets together. They were carried to various planets by four Cybertronian spacecraft, the Atlantis, the Ogygia, the Hyperborea, and the Lemuria. All four are controlled by a device called the Omega Lock, and when they are all inserted, they awaken Primus's power.

Unfortunately, the effort failed and the four Cyber Planet Keys were lost. They would remain that way for eons, until the black hole threatened Cybertron. At that point, Vector Prime emerged and told the story of the Keys to the Autobots. Eventually, they agreed to attempt Vector Prime's plan. Unfortunately, Megatron also learned of the scheme and began his own effort to gain the Planet Keys.

The Cyber Planet Keys were each marked with a symbol and colored gold. The four Cyber Planet Keys were found on Earth, Velocitron, Jungle Planet, and Gigantion.

 On Velocitron, the Key was disguised as a racing trophy.
 On Jungle Planet, it was disguised as a dragon statue in Scourge's lair.
 The Earth Key was possessed and hidden by Evac in ice.
 The Giant Planet Key lay at the very center of planet in the spaceship Lemuria.

Finally, the Autobots found the Cyber Planet Keys and the Omega Lock, and awoke Primus, who shut down the black hole, saving Cybertron and the universe. The four planets started a new space bridge project, and, finally, peace was restored.

Characters

Episodes

Cast

Adaptations
A tankōbon was released on August 5, 2005. Although it has the same idea of searching for Chip Squares and Planet Forces to extinguish the Grand Black Hole as in the anime, the storyline development and characterizations are unique. Due to the manga's cancellation, the final three chapters were never collected into a tankōbon.

Reception
Tim Janson, a reviewer for Mania.com, wrote a positive review:

Michael Drucker at IGN, reviewed the Transformers Cybertron: A New Beginning DVD, criticizing it as "A lackluster update on classic characters with minimal plot". The video quality was criticized for compression artifacts. The DVD was also criticized for its lack of extra features. Overall, the DVD was given a "bad" rating of 3 out of 10.

References

External links

 Takara page
 Official TV Tokyo Transformers: Galaxy Force website 
 Official TV Aichi Transformers: Galaxy Force website 
 Official Gonzino Transformers: Galaxy Force website 
 

2005 Japanese television series endings
2005 anime television series debuts
Children's manga
Computer-animated television series
Gonzo (company)
Japanese children's animated action television series
Japanese television series based on American television series
Robot superheroes
Super robot anime and manga
Television series set in the 2030s
Television shows set in the United States
Television series set on fictional planets
Toonami
Cybertron
Cybertron